Anakaputhur is a suburban neighbourhood of the Chennai Metropolitan Area in the Indian state of Tamil Nadu. It is located next to Pammal on the western side. Anakaputhur was once famous for its traditional weaving business, which has declined due to modern competition. As of 2011, the town had a population of 48,050.

Demographics

According to 2011 census, Anakaputhur had a population of 48,050 with a sex-ratio of 989 females for every 1,000 males, much above the national average of 929. A total of 5,404 were under the age of six, constituting 2,736 males and 2,668 females. Scheduled Castes and Scheduled Tribes accounted for 15.19% and 0.3% of the population respectively. The average literacy of the town was 78.03%, compared to the national average of 72.99%. The town had a total of 12146 households. There were a total of 18,103 workers, comprising 24 cultivators, 126 primary agricultural labourers, 382 in house hold industries, 15,517 other workers, 2,054 marginal workers, 16 marginal cultivators, 20 marginal agricultural labourers, 65 marginal workers in household industries and 1,953 other marginal workers. As per the religious census of 2011, Anakaputhur had 83.55% Hindus, 6.01% Muslims, 10.09% Christians, 0.01% Sikhs, 0.01% Buddhists, 0.14% Jains, 0.19% following other religions and 0.0% following no religion or did not indicate any religious preference.

Geography

Temples
Adanji Amman Kovil, Anakaputhur
Ayodi Amman Kovil
Angalaparameshwari Amman Kovil
Sri Varasakthi Vinayagar Mandir
Aallavatta Amman Kovil
Subramaniya Swamy Thirukkovil
Arulmigu Anandavalli Sametha Agastheeswarar Temple
Devi Shri Kanni Amman Koil
Muthumari Amman Kovil
TPM (The Pentecostal Mission)
MPA Church
Seventh Day Adventist Church
CSI Church
Jesus Lives Assemblies of God Church
St. Antony's RC Church

Theatres
Ganesh Cinemas Hall.
Velco Cinemas.
Arunmathi Theatre.

Transport
Anakaputhur is connected to other parts of Chennai by MTC and other private bus operators. Frequent services are available to Poonamallee, Kundrathur, Tambaram, Iyyapanthangal, Pattabiram, Avadi, Keelkattalai, Thiruvallur, Hasthinapuram, Broadway, Mount Road, Adayar, Thiruporur, Paduur, Thiruneermalai, and Pozhichallur. The neighborhood is served by the Pallavaram railway station  of the Chennai Suburban Railway Network and the nearest airport to Anakaputhur is Chennai International Airport (3 km).

RTO
RTO	:	TN85

Office	:	Kundrathur

Address	:	115/2D, Kundrathur Main Road, Kovoor

Pincode	:	600122

References

Cities and towns in Chengalpattu district